Importin subunit beta-1 is a protein that in humans is encoded by the KPNB1 gene.

Function 

Nucleocytoplasmic transport, a signal- and energy-dependent process, takes place through nuclear pore complexes embedded in the nuclear envelope. The import of proteins containing a classical nuclear localization signal (NLS) requires the NLS import receptor, a heterodimer of importin alpha and beta subunits. Each of these subunits are part of the karyopherin family of proteins. Importin alpha binds the NLS-containing cargo in the cytoplasm and importin beta docks the complex at the cytoplasmic side of the nuclear pore complex. In the presence of nucleoside triphosphates and the small GTP binding protein Ran, the complex moves into the nuclear pore complex and the importin subunits dissociate. Importin alpha enters the nucleoplasm with its passenger protein and importin beta remains at the pore. Interactions between importin beta and the FG repeats of nucleoporins are essential in translocation through the pore complex. The protein encoded by this gene is a member of the importin beta family.

Interactions 

KPNB1 has been shown to interact with:

 KPNA3, 
 Karyopherin alpha 1, 
 Karyopherin alpha 2, 
 Mothers against decapentaplegic homolog 3,
 NUP153 
 NUP50, 
 NUP98, 
 Nucleoporin 62, 
 P53, 
 Parathyroid hormone-related protein, 
 RANBP1, 
 RANBP2, 
 Ran (biology),  and
 SMN1.

References

Further reading